Ivan Ziatyk (Zyatyk) (1899–1952) was a member of the Redemptorists (Congregation of the Holy Redeemer) a religious congregation in the Byzantine Rite branch of the Catholic Church and is considered a martyr by the church.

Family background
Ziatyk was born on December 26th, 1899, the day after Gregorian Christmas, in the hamlet of Odrekhova near Sanok in southeastern Poland. He was the younger of two sons born to Maria and Stefan Ziatyk, his older sibling being called Mykhailo. The family were Ukrainian Rite Catholics. Stefan Ziatyk died when Ivan was 14 years of age.

Ukrainian seminary
In his late teenage years, Ziatyk decided to follow his calling from God and prepare for the Catholic priesthood. He entered the Ukrainian Catholic seminary in Przemyśl where he spent time studying Christian spirituality, philosophy, theology together with the history and Liturgy of the Ukrainian Rite Catholic Church. He was ordained to the diaconate and then priesthood in 1923.
In 1925, Ziatyk returned to the seminary where he lectured in dogmatic theology and Holy Scripture, as well as serving as spiritual director for the next ten years.

Life as a Redemptorist
For some time Ziatyk had desired to live a more austere life and, in 1935, made the decision to join the Redemptorists. Although he was an ordained priest, he was required to spend a year in the novitiate which was located near Lviv in western Ukraine, making his first profession in August 1936.
During his first year as a Redemptorist, Ziatyk lived in the monastery dedicated to Our Lady of Perpetual Help in Ivano-Frankivsk (then called Stanislaviv) before moving to another monastery in Lviv, where he was both assistant superior and treasurer. Then, in 1938, he was appointed to teach dogmatic theology at the newly opened seminary in Holosko on the outskirts of present-day Lviv. As well as being superior at Zboiska, he was engaged in the education of teenage boys interested in becoming Redemptorists.

Persecution and death
After the Second World War the Soviet regime renewed its oppression of Christian denominations; as Ukraine was part of the U.S.S.R. its people also suffered, but for a unique reason. The Soviets sought to abolish the Ukrainian Catholic Church by merging it with the Ukrainian Orthodox Church, which was considered easier to control as it was both state-sanctioned and did not acknowledge the spiritual leadership of the Bishop of Rome.
All the bishops of the Ukrainian Catholic Church (also known by some as the Greek Catholic Church) found themselves placed under arrest in early 1946. Members of the Redemptorist order were gathered at the monastery in Holosko and placed under virtual arrest for the next two years as their activities were constantly monitored by the secret police.  The members of the community were also subjected to periodic interrogation. Ziatyk came under particular scrutiny as he had become responsible for the leadership of Ukrainian Catholics. (When Archbishop Joseph Slipyj was arrested, he delegated the Belgian priest Joseph De Vocht to lead the church. After De Vocht was expelled in 1948, Ziatyk took over).

Eventually, Ziatyk was arrested in January 5th, 1950. At the end of his show trial, he was found guilty of promoting “...the ideas of the Roman Pope, of spreading the Catholic Faith among the nations of the whole world and of making all Catholics.” and “cooperating with anti-Soviet nationalistic organizations and anti-Soviet propaganda.” and sentenced to ten years hard labour. Ziatyk served time in prison, first at Zolochiv  in western Ukraine and then at Ozernyi prison near Irkutsk in Siberia. Like many other priests and religious who were imprisoned by the Soviet regime, Ziatyk endured frequent interrogations, various deprivations and torture to persuade him to renounce his faith in Christ or at least abandon his Catholicism and convert to the state-sanctioned Orthodox Church; he refused to comply.

In an interview with one of Ziatyk's fellow prisoners, Antolii Medellian, he said, "he [Fr. Ivan Ziatyk] stood and prayed the whole day; for whole day she prayed every moment. He was such a pleasant person to talk to/ You could hear many wise and instructive words from him; this was especially  so in my case, as at that time i was a youngster."

In 1952, on Good Friday (the day on which Christians commemorate the death of Christ) Ziatyk was drenched in water and beaten unconscious before being left outside in the Siberian cold. As a result of his injuries, he died a few days later and was buried in “....Cemetery 373 in the Lake Baikal zone, in the district of Tajshet in the region of Irkyts’k”

On 6 April 2001, the Holy See recognised Ivan Ziatyk as being a martyr and he was beatified by Pope John Paul II on 27 June, the feast of Our Lady of Perpetual Help, the patroness of the Redemptorists.

References

1899 births
1952 deaths
Beatified Redemptorists
Polish beatified people
20th-century Polish Roman Catholic priests
Beatifications by Pope John Paul II